Ireland competed at the 2022 World Athletics Championships in Eugene, United States, from 15 to 24 July 2022.

Results
Ireland entered 22 athletes.

Men 
Track and road events

 Field events

Women 
Track and road events

Mixed 

* – Indicates the athlete competed in preliminaries but not the final

References

External links
Oregon22｜WCH 22｜World Athletics

Nations at the 2022 World Athletics Championships
World Championships in Athletics
Ireland at the World Championships in Athletics